ArrayComm is a wireless communications software company founded in San Jose, California. Co-founded in 1992 by Martin Cooper, a pioneer of the wireless industry. The company is wholly owned by Ygomi LLC, under principal investor T. Russell Shields. The current headquarters is  Buffalo Grove, Illinois.

ArrayComm sells the physical layer (PHY) for 4G/5G wireless systems, as well as multi-antenna signal processing software for specific components of 4G PHYs using Smart Antennas and MIMO techniques. Patent-licensing is another source of revenue. The company's hardware was sold in Australia and South Africa under the iBurst brand name which continues to be owned by Kyocera.  ArrayComm also traded in Asia by selling base-station software for Personal Handy-phone System (PHS) base-stations.

Executive timeline

Alumni group
Since inception, the company has had a large contingent of employees who have maintained close contact with each other owing to the paucity of companies in the mobile wireless space. Initially this group was hosted by Yahoo, though more recently it has been reestablished on Facebook group for social networking and as a LinkedIn for business networking.

References

Companies based in Chicago
Telecommunications companies established in 1992
Antennas
1992 establishments in California